CNNgo is the online streaming platform of CNN. The website and corresponding streaming apps require a user to enter their TV Everywhere cable television user name and password to access live CNN, CNN International and HLN broadcasts and entire episodes of CNN shows, but watching news clips is completely free.

History
CNN initially announced they were offering CNNgo on September 30, 2014. CNNgo allows users to watch a live CNN video feed, on demand shows and short clips from CNN.com. This was very similar to CNN Pipeline in that it allows viewers to watch CNN live, users must enter cable television credentials before watching live television, but you can watch news clips for free. However, unlike Pipeline, users are not required to pay extra if they have a cable provider. Another difference is that there is still no paid option, meaning users cannot watch CNN live if they don't have cable TV.

CNN then announced they were bringing CNNgo to the Apple TV, amidst a wave of new channels being brought to the Apple TV. However, some users complained of not being able to sign into the Apple TV channel with as many credentials as with the apps or website.

References

External links
 CNNgo website
 CNN Website

CNN
Internet television channels